Matteo Lappoli (1450–1504) was an Italian painter of the Renaissance period. He was born at Arezzo. He studied under Fra Bartolommeo. The greater part of his paintings have perished. There are still at Arezzo, in the refectory of the Bernardines, a St. Bernard, and for the church of Santa Maria, a  St. Sebastian. His son, Giovanni Antonio Lappoli, was also a painter.

References

1450 births
1504 deaths
15th-century Italian painters
Italian male painters
16th-century Italian painters
Painters from Tuscany
Italian Renaissance painters
People from Arezzo